Münchner Neueste Nachrichten (Munich's Latest News) was a German daily newspaper published in Munich between 1848 and 1945.

The paper was first published on 9 April 1848 as a cheap way to inform the masses. The circulation rose from 7,000 in 1848 to 170,000 in 1918, making it the largest Bavarian newspaper in circulation. After the sale to a consortium consisting of the Gutehoffnungshütte AG, the Alfred Hugenberg publishing house and anonymous holding companies in 1920, the newspaper was re-aligned as a conservative and right-wing publication that favored the government of Gustav Ritter von Kahr and his successors.

Following Hitler's rise to power, the paper was taken over by the Nazi Party and aligned with its ideology. The newspaper ceased publication on 28 April 1945. The Süddeutsche Zeitung considers itself the successor of the liberal Münchner Neueste Nachrichten and has used the name for its local pages.

References

External links 

 
 Münchner Neueste Nachrichten historisches-lexikon-bayerns.de

1848 establishments in Bavaria
1945 disestablishments in Germany
Newspapers published in Munich